Chen I-chuan (20 January 1991, Taipei) is a Taiwanese swimmer. At the 2012 Summer Olympics she finished 38th overall in the heats in the Women's 100 metre breaststroke and failed to reach the semifinals.

References

Living people
Taiwanese female breaststroke swimmers
Olympic swimmers of Taiwan
Swimmers at the 2012 Summer Olympics
Swimmers at the 2010 Asian Games
Asian Games competitors for Chinese Taipei

1991 births
Sportspeople from Taipei